Makali P. Aizue (born 1977) is a Papua New Guinean former professional  rugby league footballer who last played as a  for Doncaster in Kingstone Press League 1.

Personal life
Aizue was born in Goroka, Eastern Highlands Province, Papua New Guinea.

Club career

Goroka Lahanis
Aizue started playing for the Goroka Lahanis from 1998 to 2001.

Hull Kingston Rovers 
Aizue joined Hull Kingston Rovers in 2007 after leaving the Lahanis. He played for 43 games over 4 years.

Halifax RLFC 
Aizue went to Halifax in 2011 and became the first prop choice for the club. He left the club in September 2012.

Dewsbury Rams RLFC 
Aizue joined Dewsbury Rams in 2013 till the end of 2015.

Doncaster RLFC 
Aizue has signed for Doncaster for the 2016 season.

Representative career

Papua New Guinea 
Aizue was selected in the PNG training squad and eventually for the PNG squad for the 2008 Rugby League World Cup.

He played for Papua New Guinea in the 2010 Four Nations tournament.

References

External links 
Red-carded Aizue banned and fined

1977 births
Living people
Dewsbury Rams players
Doncaster R.L.F.C. players
Expatriate rugby league players in England
Goroka Lahanis players
Halifax R.L.F.C. players
Hull Kingston Rovers players
Lae Bombers players
Papua New Guinea national rugby league team players
Papua New Guinean expatriate rugby league players
Papua New Guinean expatriate sportspeople in England
Papua New Guinean rugby league players
People from the Eastern Highlands Province
Rugby league props